Bandhadiha is a village in the Rasalupur Block of Jajpur District Odisha, India.  It is  located at the bank of the Brahmani River.  Bandhadiha 20 km from its block Rasalupur.  The village is bounded by Janak on its south, Kotapur on its west,  Nathapur on its north and Arabal on its east.

Geography
The population is approx. 2500 and the literacy rate is 86.19%.

Festivals
Bandhadiha celebrates all festivals with much fanfare and devotion. 
 Dusshera, the festival of Goddess Durga. The whole village comes to a standstill on Ashtami, Navami and in Dashami burning of the effigy of the demon Ravana (the eighth, ninth and tenth days of Dussehra).
 Kite flying is also celebrated with much enthusiasm and energy in the village. Kite-flying culminates with the Rajja, with kite-flying competitions being held all over the village. All the other regular Indian festivals like Ganesh Chaturthi, Vasant Panchami, Holi, Rath Yatra, Diwali and the numerous Hindu festivals are also celebrated here.
 Raja Parba (kite war) is also celebrated with great energy. This is one of the big festivals in my village and Raja continues for three days.

Culture
Coming to fasts and festivals, in the month of Margasira women folk worship the Goddess Laxmi.  It is the harvest season when the grain is thrashed and stored. During this auspicious occasion, the mud walls and floors are decorated with murals in white rice paste. These are called Jhoti or Chita and are drown not merely with the intention of decorating the house, but to establish a relationship between the mystical and the material, and thus being highly symbolical and meaningful. Folk painting in the tradition survives until today in all its pristine freshness. Throughout the year the village woman performs several rituals for the fulfillment of their desires.

Muruja is drawn on the floor with powders of different hues. the white powder is obtained from the grinding of stone. Green powder is obtained from dry leaves, black from burnt coconut shells, yellow is obtained from petals of marigold flowers or turmeric and red from red clay or bricks. Muruja is generally drowning during rituals in the form of Mandala. In the holy month of ‘Kartika’ women observe, penance and draw muruja designs near the Tulasi Chaura.

Pala
Pala represents important aspects of Odisha folk culture. It forms an integral part of the lives of the rural folk. Arabal has kept these traditions alive.

Agriculture
Rice is traditionally grown in two well defined seasons, namely Kharif and Dalua in Bandhadiha.  Of these two, Kharif (rainy) is the most important rice season. The Kharif rice is the main crop, covering over 85% of the total rice area, and depends entirely on the southwest monsoon. It is sown in June and harvested in October–December, depending upon the duration of the cultivation and topography of the field.  After harvesting Kharif rice farmers keeps them self busy in cultivating badam almond. Badam almond is the main source of incoming money in Arabal.

See also 
 Jaraka

References 

Villages in Jajpur district